Eyes Open, Harry! (German: Achtung Harry! Augen auf!) is a 1926 German silent thriller film directed by and starring Harry Piel. It was shot at the Staaken Studios in Berlin. The film's sets were designed by Willi Herrmann.

Cast
 Eugen Burg as Graham Horst  
 Colette Corder as Rote Gräfin  
 Karl Falkenberg as Prinz Achmed  
 Jaro Fürth as Chefredakteur  
 Georg John as Nathan Miller  
 Denise Legeay as Ethel Horst  
 Harry Piel as Harry

References

Bibliography
 Grange, William. Cultural Chronicle of the Weimar Republic. Scarecrow Press, 2008.

External links

1926 films
Films of the Weimar Republic
German silent feature films
Films directed by Harry Piel
1920s thriller films
German thriller films
German black-and-white films
Phoebus Film films
Silent thriller films
1920s German films
Films shot at Staaken Studios